The G-Clefs were an American doo-wop/rhythm and blues vocal group, from Roxbury, Massachusetts, United States.

The G-Clefs consisted of four brothers and a fifth member who was a childhood friend. They first sang together at St Richard's Catholic Church, in their hometown of Roxbury. They were subsequently discovered by a talent scout named Jack Gold, who encouraged them to perform professionally. They began performing in greater Boston in the early 1950s. They scored two Top 40 hits in the United States: their 1956 single "Ka-Ding-Dong", featuring Freddy Cannon on guitar, peaked at No. 24 on the Billboard Hot 100; it was the first national hit for their Boston-based label, Pilgrim Records. Their other hit song was 1961's "I Understand (Just How You Feel)", which used the melody from "Auld Lang Syne", reached No. 9. The latter track reached No. 17 in the UK Singles Chart in late 1961.

They continued to play locally in greater Boston, at the Strand Theater in Uphams Corner (Dorchester, Massachusetts), and throughout the area into the 2000s.

Ray Gipson died in 2015 at the age of 77. Tim Scott died in 2017 at the age of 78. Teddy Scott died in 2018 at the age of 82.

Members
Teddy Scott (born Bryce Theodore Scott; February 29, 1936 – October 27, 2018)
Chris Scott (born Christian Scott in 1937)
Tim Scott (born Timothy Scott; 1938 – May 16, 2017)
Arnold (Ilanga) Scott (born 1940, died December 24, 2022)
Ray Gipson (born Ramon Gipson; September 24, 1937 – January 4, 2015)
Ira Kweller - keyboard player (1952 – July 2018)

References

External links
The G-Clefs biography & discography I
The G-Clefs biography & discography II
The G-Clefs record label shots
Article on The G-Clefs

American rhythm and blues musical groups
Doo-wop groups
Musical groups from Massachusetts
Musical quintets
Sibling musical groups